Gowijeh Qaleh (also Romanized as Gowījeh Qal‘eh; also known as Gowjeh Qal‘eh and Gowjeh Qal’eh) is a village in Charuymaq-e Jonubegharbi Rural District of the Central District of Charuymaq County, East Azerbaijan province, Iran. At the 2006 National Census, its population was 709 in 134 households. The following census in 2011 counted 691 people in 178 households. The latest census in 2016 showed a population of 534 people in 172 households; it was the largest village in its rural district.

References 

Charuymaq County

Populated places in East Azerbaijan Province

Populated places in Charuymaq County